Philip Dray is an American writer and historian, known for his comprehensive analyses of American scientific, racial, and labor history.

Awards

Dray's work At the Hands of Persons Unknown: The Lynching of Black America (by Random House Publishing Group) won the Robert F. Kennedy Book Award. He was a finalist in 2003 for a Pulitzer Prize in history.

Books
 Philip Dray. There Is Power in a Union: The Epic Story of Labor in America. Doubleday, 2010. 
 Philip Dray. Capitol Men: The Epic Story of Reconstruction Through the Lives of the First Black Congressmen. Mariner Books, 2010. 
 Philip Dray. Stealing God's Thunder: Benjamin Franklin's Lightning Rod and the Invention of America. Random House, 2005. 
 Philip Dray. At the Hands of Persons Unknown: The Lynching of Black America. Modern Library, 2003. 
 We Are Not Afraid

Children's books
 Philip Dray. Yours for Justice, Ida B. Wells: The Daring Life of a Crusading Journalist. Illustrated by Stephen Alcorn. Peachtree, 2008.

References

External links 
 Philip Dray speaker on PBS & NPR Forum Network

Independent reviews

At the Hands of Persons Unknown
 'At the Hands of Persons Unknown' review at History Connected

Power in a Union
 'Power in a Union' review at Cleveland.com
 'Power in a Union' review at Washington Post

Stealing God's Thunder
 'Stealing God's Thunder' review at History Cooperative
 'Stealing God's Thunder' review at eNotes.com

Capitol men
 'Capitol Men' review in New York Times

Interviews
 Video of Philip Dray on "The Daily Show", Comedy Central, aired on October 6, 2010
 Fresh Air, "Interview with Terry Gross", WHYY, aired on 2002-01-21

American male writers
Year of birth missing (living people)
Living people